Olga Nikolayevna Novokshchenova (November 29, 1974, Moscow, USSR) is a Russian Synchro-swimmer.

She has two Olympic gold medals (2000, 2004), and a winner of World (1997, 1998, 2000) and European Championships (1997, 1999, 2000, 2004), World Cups and other tournaments.

She is a member of National team since 1992. Now, she is the manager of public relations for Russian Paralympic Committee. She also teaches synchronized swimming in Port Antonio, Jamaica.

References

External links
 Sport Russia - profile 

Russian synchronized swimmers
Olympic synchronized swimmers of Russia
Synchronized swimmers at the 1996 Summer Olympics
Synchronized swimmers at the 2000 Summer Olympics
Synchronized swimmers at the 2004 Summer Olympics
Olympic gold medalists for Russia
1974 births
Living people
Swimmers from Moscow
Olympic medalists in synchronized swimming
Medalists at the 2004 Summer Olympics
Medalists at the 2000 Summer Olympics